is a Japanese game director and scenario writer who has been working for Square Enix since 1994. He initially worked on cutscenes in Bahamut Lagoon and Final Fantasy VII before serving as one of the 3 directors on Final Fantasy X under Yoshinori Kitase where he was incharge of events.

Toriyama started directing himself with Final Fantasy X-2 and has continued doing so with Final Fantasy XII: Revenant Wings, Blood of Bahamut, Final Fantasy XIII, Final Fantasy XIII-2, Lightning Returns: Final Fantasy XIII and Mobius Final Fantasy.

He also co-directed the Final Fantasy VII Remake and is part of the Final Fantasy Committee that is tasked with keeping the franchise's releases and content consistent.

Biography
Motomu Toriyama joined Square around the time of the Final Fantasy VI launch in 1994. He later mentioned that he enjoyed how everyone on the development team had the opportunity to contribute their ideas without any solid job description. He was assigned to work on Bahamut Lagoon as his first project due to his lack of game development experience. For Final Fantasy VII, Toriyama designed events such as the ones taking place at the Honey Bee Inn. As the designers were given much artistic freedom, he would often create cutscenes that were unlikely to be approved and thus were eventually changed or removed. Toriyama also wrote and directed many of the scenes revolving around Aerith Gainsborough and Cloud Strife. He tried to make Aerith an important character to the player in order to maximize the impact of her death later in the plot.

After the merger between Square and Enix in 2003, many rookie staff members had to be trained and there were more new platforms to develop for with the release of the Nintendo DS and PlayStation Portable. Toriyama decided to assemble and direct a team of scenario writers and joined various game projects. He later collaborated with Final Fantasy X main programmer Koji Sugimoto and supervisor Yoshinori Kitase to create a Final Fantasy VII tech demo for the PlayStation 3. Development of this took around 6 weeks. During the first year after the development start of Final Fantasy XIII in April 2004, Toriyama thought up a story premised on the Fabula Nova Crystallis mythology created by Kazushige Nojima. In March 2006, when the structural part of the narrative started to come together and lead scenario writer Daisuke Watanabe joined the team, Toriyama showed him a rough outline of what he had written and asked him to flesh out the story and to correct how everything would connect.

Toriyama has been the scenario director and supervisor on games in the Final Fantasy Crystal Chronicles series as well as Dissidia: Final Fantasy and The 3rd Birthday, which entailed the creation of a story concept and the supervision of the character conception and scenario writing by his team of authors. For Lightning Returns, he added an online communication system known as the "Outerworld Services". Among others, it enabled players to write posts on social networks that would then appear as a non-playable character's comment in another player's game. Toriyama's goal with this was to create an online community where the individual members would interact and enjoy the game's world together without being online at the same time, as a precursor to online features found in eight-generation video game consoles. The main ideas for all the areas in Lightning Returns came from him as well.

Toriyama has been incharge of the music for all of the games he's directed since Final Fantasy X. With Final Fantasy XIII he wrote lyrics for the first time and again did so for its two sequels and later Mobius Final Fantasy. With Final Fantasy VII Remake he wrote all of the song titles for the first time in addition to again writing lyrics.

Toriyama was also incharge of motion capture and voice recordings on Final Fantasy X.

Game design
Toriyama believes his strength is in directing games that are very story-driven. He also thinks that it becomes very difficult to tell a compelling story when the player is given a huge amount of freedom to explore. According to him, the most important aspect of a Final Fantasy game is the characters. Toriyama explains that there are different approaches to creating a protagonist: with Yuna from Final Fantasy X, the general plot had already been set when the character was conceived; with Lightning from Final Fantasy XIII instead, the character's personality was decided upon before the backstory was written. He feels that a developer needs to "essentially fall in love at first sight with a character" to "keep [themselves] going". Toriyama considers the voice the "main image of the character" and thus "the most delicate part of making the character".

Toriyama has stated that the aim of the linear game design used in the first half of Final Fantasy XIII was to feel like watching a film. This was done to absorb the player into the story and to introduce them to the characters and their battle abilities without becoming distracted or lost. Toriyama explained that the amount of memory and processing power needed to produce impressive graphics was the main reason not to have a seamless battle system for Final Fantasy XIII. He is interested in using first-person shooter games for inspiration rather than Western role-playing video games, as he believes they give a better sense of tension during battles. Toriyama would later use games such as Red Dead Redemption and The Elder Scrolls V: Skyrim  as inspirations for Final Fantasy XIII-2 and Lightning Returns: Final Fantasy XIII, respectively. He feels that his role of director marked a shift from creating a game world based on his own vision to unifying a team's ideas into a cohesive whole.

Works

Video games

Other projects

Additional credits

Notes
 The novel was cancelled due to the author falling ill, however material from it would be Incorporated into Final Fantasy XIII: Reminiscence -tracer of memories-.

References

External links

Square Enix people
Final Fantasy designers
Japanese video game directors
Living people
1971 births